Ranina is a genus of crabs belonging to the family Raninidae.

Ranina ranina is the only extant species. All the others are extinct.

Fossils of these crabs have been found in the sediments of United States, Mexico, Italy, Turkey and Australia from the Paleogene period to Recent (age range: 48.6 to 0.0 Ma).

Species
Species within this genus include:
† Ranina americana  Withers, 1924
† Ranina berglundi  Squires and Demetrion, 1992
† Ranina bouilleana  Milne-Edwards, 1872
† Ranina brevispina  Lorenthey, 1898
† Ranina burleighensis  Holland and Cvancara, 1958
† Ranina cuspidata  Guppy, 1909
† Ranina elegans  Rathbun, 1945
† Ranina granulosa  Milne-Edwards, 1872
† Ranina haszlinskyi  Reuss, 1859
† Ranina hirsuta  Schafhautl, 1863
† Ranina lamiensis  Rathbun, 1945
† Ranina molengraaffi  Van Straelen, 1924
† Ranina oblonga  Munster, 1840
† Ranina palmea  Sismonda, 1846
† Ranina porifera  Woodward, 1866
† Ranina propinqua  Ristori, 1891
† Ranina quinquespinosa  Rathbun, 1945
 Ranina ranina Linnaeus, 1758 (the only extant species)
† Ranina speciosa  Munster, 1840
† Ranina tejoniana  Rathbun, 1926

References

Crabs
Paleogene genus first appearances
Extant Paleogene first appearances
Taxa named by Jean-Baptiste Lamarck